There were 10 archery events at the 2018 South American Games in Cochabamba, Bolivia. Four for men and women and two mixes. The events were held between June 2 and 6 at the Complejo Aurora.

Medal summary

Recurve

Compound

Medal table

References

External links
 2018 South American Games – Archery 
 Results Book

2018 South American Games events
2018
South American Games